Scott Gray (born in the United States) is an American motorcycle racer.

Grand Prix motorcycle racing

By season

Grand Prix motorcycle racing
(key) (Races in bold indicate pole position)

External links
biography at motogp.com

American motorcycle racers
Living people
Year of birth missing (living people)